The 2021–22 1. FC Saarbrücken season was the 115th season in the club's football history. They played in the 3. Liga, their second consecutive season in the third tier since being promoted from the Regionalliga. They also participated in the Saarland Cup.

Transfers

In

Out

Competitions

Friendlies

3. Liga

League table

Matches

Saarland Cup

References 

1. FC Saarbrücken seasons
German football clubs 2021–22 season